FC Morkovice is a Czech football club located in Morkovice-Slížany in the Zlín Region. It currently plays in the fifth tier of Czech football. The club has taken part in the Czech Cup numerous times, reaching the second round in 2005–06.

References

External links
 Official website  

Football clubs in the Czech Republic
Association football clubs established in 1943
Zlín Region